Tetramethylethylene is a hydrocarbon with the formula Me2C=CMe2 (Me = methyl).  A colorless liquid, it is the simplest tetrasubstituted alkene.

Synthesis and reactions
It is prepared by base-catalyzed isomerization of 2,3-dimethyl-1-butene.

Tetramethylethylene forms metal-alkene complexes with low-valent metals and reacts with diborane to give the monoalkyborane known as thexylborane.

References

Alkenes